Paqe Island (meaning 'Island of Peace') is a small island located in the Lake Koman in the north of Albania. It is found in one of the lake's river canyons. Paqe Island is only 160m long. The island is small with many trees on top of it. There are many islands in Lake Fierza as well as in Lake Koman in northern Albania that are much larger and more stony textured than Paqe Island's sandy ground.

Uninhabited islands of Albania
Lake islands of Albania
Geography of Shkodër County